"The Green Manalishi (With the Two Prong Crown)" is a song written by Peter Green and recorded by Fleetwood Mac. It was released as a single in the UK in May 1970 and reached No. 10 on the British charts, a position it occupied for four consecutive weeks, and was the band's last UK top 10 hit until "Tusk" reached No. 6 in 1979. "The Green Manalishi" was the last song Green made with Fleetwood Mac before leaving the band.

Composition
The song was written during Green's final months with the band, at a time when he was struggling with LSD and had withdrawn from other members of the band. While there are several theories about the meaning of the title "Green Manalishi", Green always maintained that the song is about money, as represented by the devil. Green was reportedly angered by the other band members' refusal to share their financial gains.

Green has explained that he wrote the song after experiencing a drug-induced dream in which he was visited by a green dog which barked at him from the afterlife. He understood that the dog represented money. "It scared me because I knew the dog had been dead a long time. It was a stray and I was looking after it. But I was dead and had to fight to get back into my body, which I eventually did. When I woke up, the room was really black and I found myself writing the song." He added that he wrote the lyrics the following day, in Richmond Park. Supposedly, he was unable to record Robert Johnson's "Hellhound on My Trail" following the incident, having conflated Johnson's hellhound with the green dog-demon of his dream. This is supported by his discography, in which Green's sole post-Manalishi cover of "Hellhound" was sung by bandmate Nigel Watson.

Producer Martin Birch recalled that Green was initially frustrated because he could not get the sound he wanted, but Danny Kirwan reassured him that they would stay in the studio all night until the band got it right. Green said later that although the session left him exhausted, "Green Manalishi" was still one of his best musical memories. "Lots of drums, bass guitars... Danny Kirwan and me playing those shrieking guitars together... I thought it would make Number One."

The B-side of the single was an instrumental written by Green and Danny Kirwan, titled "World In Harmony". The two tracks were recorded at the same session in Warner/Reprise Studios, in Hollywood, California. The only track bearing a Kirwan/Green writing credit, the two had plans to collaborate further on a guitar-driven album, but the project never materialised.

Live versions
A 16-minute live version of "The Green Manalishi" was recorded in February 1970, prior to the single's release in May, but it remained unreleased until 1985 when it was unofficially released on a number of records, such as Shanghai Records' Cerulean and Rattlesnake Shake. In 1998 it was issued with along with the entire set of recordings on the Live in Boston: Remastered three-CD boxed set.

The song was played live by subsequent versions of Fleetwood Mac with Bob Welch and then Lindsey Buckingham singing the vocal and taking on the song's guitar parts.

Personnel
Peter Green – guitar, vocals, six string bass
Danny Kirwan – guitar
John McVie – bass guitar
Mick Fleetwood – drums, gong, maracas, claves

Though he appeared in the photo on the single cover sleeve, Jeremy Spencer is thought not to have been present at the recording sessions, though he was present when Green was recording the eerie howling noises heard at the end of the song, according to an interview with Spencer on the BBC Peter Green documentary DVD, "Man of the World".

Chart positions

Judas Priest version

Heavy metal band Judas Priest covered the song on their 1979 album Hell Bent for Leather (the American version of Killing Machine). The first worldwide release was on the band's live album, Unleashed in the East, released later that year. A re-recording of the song was also added as a bonus track on the German/Australian version of the album Demolition in 2001. The band performed it on Live Aid at JFK Stadium, Pennsylvania in 1985. This version features a dual guitar solo played by Glenn Tipton and K. K. Downing.

PopMatters said the cover, "succeeded in such a way that the Priest version is now far more famous than the original. They make it their own, accelerating the pace just enough to achieve a better balance of force and menace, and the groove created by drummer Les Binks cinches it. Priest’s towering version is nevertheless an all-time heavy metal classic."

Other cover versions
"The Green Manalishi" has been covered by other artists and bands:
Corrosion of Conformity covered the song, using Judas Priest's arrangement, on their 1984 album Eye for an Eye.
Melvins recorded a version of the song for their 1999 album The Maggot.

References

1970 singles
Songs about drugs
Fleetwood Mac songs
Judas Priest songs
Songs written by Peter Green (musician)
1970 songs
Reprise Records singles